Densmore Ronald "Den" Dover (born 4 April 1938) is a British politician. Representing the Conservative Party, he was the Member of Parliament (MP) for the constituency of Chorley from 1979 to 1997. He then served as a Member of the European Parliament (MEP) for the region of North West England, from 1999 to 2009.

He was forced to resign the position of Chief Whip, before being expelled from the party, over investigations into his expenses, and stood down from the European Parliament at the 2009 European Elections.

Biography
Dover was born in Stockton Heath, Cheshire. Educated at King George V School, Southport until transferring to Manchester Grammar School where he won the bowling prize at cricket. Dover gained a First Class Honours degree in Civil Engineering at Manchester University.

Career
Dover worked in the construction industry across Europe, working for John Laing plc, George Wimpey, and as Chief Executive for the National Building Agency. Dover was latterly Director of Housing Construction with the Greater London Council, before entering politics on a full-time basis when he became an MP.

Personal life
Dover is married to Kathleen, with a son and a daughter, Amanda. He plays cricket, golf and hockey.

Political career
Dover served on the London Borough of Barnet Council, and was a Member of its Education, Finance and Public Works Committees. He stood unsuccessfully for Parliament at Caerphilly in October 1974, being beaten by Labour's Fred Evans.

MP for Chorley
Dover served as the Conservative Member of Parliament for Chorley, from May 1979 to April 1997, until he was defeated by Lindsay Hoyle, future Speaker of the House of Commons.

MEP for North West England
Dover was first elected to the European Parliament in 1999, and was re elected in June 2004.

Resignation
Dover resigned as Conservative Chief Whip in the European Parliament on 6 June 2008. The revelation that forced the resignation was that over nine years he had paid his wife and daughter £750,000 from public funds. (This came after the Conservatives' Leader in Europe, Giles Chichester, resigned because he put large sums of money for secretarial and office work through the account of a company of which he was a paid director.)

Dover was forced to resign by acting Conservative MEP Leader, Philip Bushill-Matthews, who had been appointed only a day prior. Dover was replaced as Conservative Chief Whip by Richard Ashworth MEP.

An inquiry by the European Parliament found him guilty of a conflict of interest, and he was ordered to repay £500,000 of the expenses. The Parliament's ruling lead to Dover being expelled from the Conservative Party. 

Dover's case was passed to the European Anti-Fraud Office for investigation. Dover stood down from the European Parliament at the 2009 European Elections. This ruling was later annulled in March 2011. Dover was not required to repay any expenses. Both the EU parliament and Dover were required bear their own costs.

References

External links
Profile at European Parliament website

 

1938 births
Living people
People from Stockton Heath
People educated at Manchester Grammar School
Alumni of the University of Manchester
English civil engineers
Conservative Party (UK) MPs for English constituencies
UK MPs 1979–1983
UK MPs 1983–1987
UK MPs 1987–1992
UK MPs 1992–1997
Conservative Party (UK) MEPs
Councillors in the London Borough of Barnet
MEPs for England 1999–2004
MEPs for England 2004–2009